Sunlit Chemical is a Taiwanese chemical company.

History 
Sunlit Chemical was founded in 1972. They were the first company in Taiwan to produce hydrofluoric acid and fluoride. In 2021 they controlled 75% of the global oral care sodium fluoride market.

Operations 
In 2022 Sunlit broke ground on a 900,000 sq ft manufacturing facility on a site in Phoenix, Arizona to supply a TSMC fab being built in the same city. They had acquired the 17 acre site in 2021.

Products 
 Sodium fluoride
 hydrofluoric acid
 Ammonium fluoride
 Phosphoric acid
 Hydrogen fluoride

References 

Multinational companies headquartered in Taiwan
Chemical companies of Taiwan